Timothy Michael Cluess (born March 9, 1959) is an American college basketball coach who most recently was the head men's basketball coach at Iona College. He is also a former head coach of Long Island University–C.W. Post.

College playing career
Born in Queens, New York, Cluess played college basketball at St. John's (1979–81) and Hofstra (1982–83).

Professional playing career
Cluess played professionally in Europe and Australia.

Coaching career

High school
Cluess was the head coach of Saint Mary's High School in Manhasset, New York for 14 seasons (1991–2005). Cluess's Gaels won four Class A New York State Catholic High School Athletic Association (NYSCHSAA) championships and two New York State Federation of Secondary Schools Athletic Associations (NYSFSSA) championships. However, St. Mary's played in the Class A Division, and failed to advance past the New York City representative from the much stronger Class AA Division each time they attempted to advance for the right to play in the New York State Class AA Federation Tournament.

In 2004–05, Saint Mary's posted a 25–1 overall record. The lone loss came against a New York City team, Xaverian, from the class AA Division as St. Mary's once again failed to advance past New York City in the Class AA Division.

College
Cluess’ first college coaching job was the 2005–06 Suffolk County Community College team that finished with a regular season record of 20–9. They appeared in their first NJCAA Division III tournament that year, winning their first two games before being eliminated in their third game and finishing the season at 22–10.

After one year at the junior college level, Cluess became the head coach for the Long Island University C.W. Post Campus Pioneers. He led the team to three straight first-place finishes in the East Coast Conference, including two conference tournament titles in 2007–08 and 2008–09. In four seasons at LIU-Post, Cluess led the team to two NCAA Division II men's basketball tournaments in 2008 and 2009. The 2008–09 squad finished the regular season with a record of 24–0, in route to an NCAA Division II Elite Eight tournament appearance and a 30–1 final record.

In April 2010 Cluess replaced Kevin Willard as the head men's basketball coach at Iona College. Cluess' record in nine seasons at Iona was 199–108.

Just before the 2019–20 pre-season, Cluess took a leave of absence to deal with personal health issues, and associate head coach Tra Arnold took over head coaching duties for the season.

On March 13, 2020, Cluess stepped down from Iona due to his health issues. Rick Pitino was named to replace Cluess as head coach the next day.

Head coaching record

Junior college

College

References

External links
 Iona profile

1959 births
Living people
American expatriate basketball people in Australia
American men's basketball coaches
American men's basketball players
Basketball coaches from New York (state)
Basketball players from New York City
College men's basketball head coaches in the United States
High school basketball coaches in New York (state)
Hofstra Pride men's basketball players
Iona Gaels men's basketball coaches
Junior college men's basketball coaches in the United States
LIU Post Pioneers men's basketball coaches
Small forwards
Sportspeople from Queens, New York
St. John's Red Storm men's basketball players